The Ballad of the Fallen is a jazz album by bassist Charlie Haden, with arrangements by Carla Bley,  that was recorded in 1982 and released in 1983.  The album was voted jazz album of the year in  Down Beat magazine's 1984 critic's poll. Haden and Carla Bley placed first in that 1984 poll's Acoustic Bass and Composer categories, respectively.

The album is the second by Haden's Liberation Music Orchestra, the follow-up to their 1969 Liberation Music Orchestra.  Carla Bley, Don Cherry, Michael Mantler, Paul Motian, Dewey Redman, and Haden himself appeared in the LMO's new incarnation with six new members.

Track listing 
 LP side A: 
1. "Els Segadors" ("The Reapers") (Catalan traditional) – 4:14
2. "The Ballad of the Fallen" (folk song from El Salvador) – 4:19
3. - "If You Want to Write Me" ("Si Me Quieres Escribir") (traditional) – 3:55
4. - "Grandola Vila Morena" (José Afonso) – 2:11
5. - "Introduction to People" (Carla Bley) – 3:55
6. - "The People United Will Never Be Defeated" ("El Pueblo Unido Jamás Será Vencido!") (Sergio Ortega) – 1:40
7. "Silence" (Charlie Haden) – 5:49
LP side B:
1. "Too Late" (Carla Bley) – 8:24
2. "La Pasionaria" (Charlie Haden) – 10:26
3. "La Santa Espina" (Àngel Guimerà/Enric Morera) – 6:58

Personnel 
 Charlie Haden – double bass
 Carla Bley – piano, glockenspiel, arrangements
 Dewey Redman – tenor saxophone
 Jim Pepper – flute, soprano saxophone, tenor saxophone
 Steve Slagle – clarinet, flute, alto saxophone, soprano saxophone
 Michael Mantler – trumpet
 Gary Valente – trombone
 Sharon Freeman – French horn
 Jack Jeffers – tuba
 Don Cherry – pocket trumpet
 Mick Goodrick – guitar
 Paul Motian – percussion, drums

References

External links 
The Story behind the Ballad of the Fallen, by Charlie Haden’s Liberation Music Orchestra at The Music Aficionado, Jan.3, 2017
Liner notes at ECM, accessed 5/1/2018

1983 albums
Experimental big band albums
Avant-garde jazz albums
Liberation Music Orchestra albums
Charlie Haden albums
Carla Bley albums
ECM Records albums
Albums produced by Manfred Eicher